Willard Smith may refer to:

Will Smith (born 1968), American musician and actor
Willard J. Smith (1910–2000), U.S. Coast Guard commandant 
Willard M. Smith (1840–1918), American Medal of Honor recipient 
Willard G. Smith (1827–1903), Utah territorial legislator
Elias Willard Smith (1816–1886), American architect and civil engineer.
Willard Smith, contestant on Survivor: Palau (2005)